The Stripped Tour, also known as Stripped World Tour and Stripped... Live, was the third concert tour and second world tour by American singer Christina Aguilera. The tour was launched in support of her fourth studio album, Stripped (2002), beginning on September 22, 2003 at the Color Line Arena in Hamburg, Germany, and concluded on December 17, 2003 at the Rod Laver Arena in Melbourne, Australia. The tour visited cities in Europe, Asia and Australia throughout a total of 37 concerts. The Stripped Tour was the second tour in support of Stripped. The album was promoted across North America through The Justified & Stripped Tour which was co-headlined with Justin Timberlake. The tour concluded in September 2003. Aguilera extended her part of the show and continued the tour without Timberlake, taking the show to other territories.

The tour was scheduled to return for another 29 dates in North America in May 2004, but it was ultimately cancelled due to Aguilera suffering a vocal cord injury in early 2004. The performances at the Wembley Arena in London were taped and broadcast in November 2003 under the name Stripped Live in the U.K.. It was later released as a video album in October 2004.

Background 
Despite achieving success with her early work, Aguilera was unsatisfied with the material and image created for her. Aguilera took creative control of the creation of her fourth studio album, adopting a more sexual image and an alter ego named Xtina. Stripped was released in October 2002. After promoting the album through several promotional appearances, Aguilera scheduled a North American co-headlining tour with Justin Timberlake, who she knew from The All-New Mickey Mouse Club. The tour was held in support of Stripped and Timberlake's debut album, Justified, which were released around the same time. The tour visited North America throughout summer 2003. The tour concluded on September 2, 2003. Aguilera scheduled an additional 37 international tour dates without Timberlake. Black Eyed Peas returned as the opening act for the U.K. and Ireland shows, and So Solid Crew took the spot for the rest of the European shows.

Concert synopsis 
The Stripped Tour's synopsis is quite similar to Aguilera's part during The Justified & Stripped Tour in 2003. The tour began with the video introduction of "Stripped Intro", featuring Aguilera handcuffed, blindfolded and sitting in a chair as the words "scandal", "gossip" and "lies" flashed across the screen. Then, the curtain dropped, she strutted out singing "Dirrty" and "Get Mine, Get Yours", with big curly black locks, a black and hot-pink halter with belly-baring plunging neckline, pants and spiked heels. She performed "The Voice Within" as the follow-up, with a long black dress. The acoustic version of "Come On Over Baby (All I Want Is You)" sounded "like a seasoned veteran of decades". During the performance, she gave a speech, "Thank you so much for coming... I'm getting that feeling again and it's a blessing. Yes, I've grown up a little bit. Now I'm 22... I'm so happy you've grown with me". Aguilera took off the stage again, performing the "Egyptian-turned-metal" version "Genie in a Bottle", where she rolled on a giant "X" which portrayed her then newly established alter ego "Xtina". Wearing "hot pink straps attached to her outfit", she slowly unraveled herself as the "genie" in the song, provocatively danced her way out of the bottle.

The performance of "Can't Hold Us Down" featured a pink "spark-shooting" motorcycle, with girls dancing around and against boys who tried to poke them. Then, she belted out "Make Over", a "lush", midtempo pop rock song with the "rhythmic trot of a Spanish spaghetti Western", featuring "chain-link fence". During the medley of two Spanish songs from Mi Reflejo, "Contigo en la Distancia" and "Falsas Esperanzas", a male dancer ripped off the skirt she wore, revealing tiny denim boy-cut shorts underneath. Later, she "saucily" replied, "Just because my album is called 'Stripped,' doesn't mean you can take my clothes off". Following the video interlude of "Loving Me 4 Me", she performed the ballad "Impossible". She changed into a "silky empire-waisted" red dress to channel her favorite singer, Etta James, and performed James' two hits, "At Last" and "I Prefer You". The rendition of "Lady Marmalade" from the soundtrack Moulin Rouge! was described as "a playful romp" between four male dancers dressed as sailors and four female members of the troupe in lingerie. She continued with the "gorgeous ache" of her own waltz ballad, "Walk Away". The performance of "Fighter" had more feelings and excitements, though the sound mix was lacking, and the performance version of "What a Girl Wants" was provided with some well-deserved dance moves, in which she dressed a purple shirt and shorts. Aguilera ended her part with "Beautiful", wearing jeans and a T-shirt which emblazoned with the words "God sees no color".

Broadcasts and recordings 

The shows at the Wembley Arena in London were filmed and put together into a video recording of the show. Titled Stripped Live in the U.K., it premiered on the WB Network at 9 PM on November 30, 2003. The video was later released on DVD format on October 12, 2004.

Set list 
The following set list was obtained from the September 24, 2003 concert, held at the Forum Copenhagen in Copenhagen, Denmark. It does not represent all concerts during the tour.
 "Stripped (Intro)" 
 "Dirrty"
 "Get Mine, Get Yours"
 "The Voice Within"
 "Genie in a Bottle"
 "Make Over"
 "Contigo en la Distancia" / "Falsas Esperanzas"
 "Infatuation"
 "Come On Over Baby (All I Want Is You)"
 "Cruz"
 "Loving Me 4 Me" 
 "Impossible"
 "At Last" / "I Prefer You"
 "Lady Marmalade"
 "Walk Away"
 "Fighter"
 "Stripped, Pt. 2 
 "What a Girl Wants"
 "Beautiful"

Shows

Cancelled shows

North American tour cancellation 

The success of the tour lead to a series of dates being scheduled in North America. The show was expected to be revised and have a new theme for a summer tour in 2004. The tour was expected to begin on May 13, 2004 in Auburn, Washington, and to conclude on July 3, 2004, with American rapper Chingy joining her for 29 dates. Tickets went on sale on March 13, 2004. In April 2004, Aguilera was told by doctors to remain on vocal rest for six week after she suffered a vocal cord injury, leading to all 29 concerts getting cancelled one month prior to the tour's beginning. She expressed disappointment in having to cancel the tour, and it was announced that refunds would be processed. However, service company FansRule had filed for Chapter 11 bankruptcy protection, and had no ability to refund the money to buyers. Aguilera's team then hired legal representation to deal with the designated trustees for FansRule, Joe Baldiga and John Aquino, and the bankruptcy court to help the fans. According to Baldiga, $320,000 was due as repayment to the hundreds of Aguilera fans who had bought VIP tickets. Aguilera's publicists said in a statement:You should know that Christina has arranged through her attorneys to ensure that consumers would be receiving the maximum return possible, by virtue of the fact that Christina has agreed that any amounts due to her and her company should instead be used to satisfy the claims of the many fans who purchased tickets through FansRule.Fans would finally be able to get refunds two years after the cancellation.

Shows

See also 
 List of Christina Aguilera concerts
 List of Christina Aguilera concert tours

Notes

References

External links 

 Christina Aguilera's official website

Christina Aguilera concert tours
2003 concert tours